Australia Plains is a small town in the Regional Council of Goyder in South Australia. The post office, school and church have all closed. The current boundaries for the Bounded Locality were established in August 2000.

The town drew its name from "Australia Hutss" which appeared on old pastoral lease plans. The post office operated from 1 April 1882 to 31 May 1971. A public school at Australia Plains operated from 1917 until 1956, replacing an earlier Lutheran school that was forced to close during World War I.

References